Marin Čilić defeated Novak Djokovic in the final, 5–7, 7–6(7–4), 6–3 to win the singles tennis title at the 2018 Queen's Club Championships. He saved a championship point in the second set. This was Djokovic's first ATP Tour final in almost a year, and Čilić's second victory over Djokovic in their 16 matches played.

Feliciano López was the defending champion, but lost in the quarterfinals to Nick Kyrgios.

Seeds

Draw

Finals

Top half

Bottom half

Qualifying

Seeds

Qualifiers

Qualifying draw

First qualifier

Second qualifier

Third qualifier

Fourth qualifier

References

Main draw
Qualifying draw

Queen's Club Championships - Singles
2018 Queen's Club Championships